Chak 2 NB is a village in Sargodha district, Bhalwal tehsil, Punjab, Pakistan.

References 

Populated places in Sargodha District